Events from the year 1972 in Canada.

Incumbents

Crown 
 Monarch – Elizabeth II

Federal government 
 Governor General – Roland Michener
 Prime Minister – Pierre Trudeau
 Chief Justice – Gérald Fauteux (Quebec)
 Parliament – 28th (until 1 September)

Provincial governments

Lieutenant governors 
Lieutenant Governor of Alberta – Grant MacEwan  
Lieutenant Governor of British Columbia – John Robert Nicholson 
Lieutenant Governor of Manitoba – William John McKeag 
Lieutenant Governor of New Brunswick – Hédard Robichaud
Lieutenant Governor of Newfoundland – Ewart John Arlington Harnum 
Lieutenant Governor of Nova Scotia – Victor de Bedia Oland  
Lieutenant Governor of Ontario – William Ross Macdonald
Lieutenant Governor of Prince Edward Island – John George MacKay 
Lieutenant Governor of Quebec – Hugues Lapointe 
Lieutenant Governor of Saskatchewan – Stephen Worobetz

Premiers 
Premier of Alberta – Peter Lougheed  
Premier of British Columbia – W.A.C. Bennett (until September 15) then Dave Barrett 
Premier of Manitoba – Edward Schreyer  
Premier of New Brunswick – Richard Hatfield
Premier of Newfoundland – Joey Smallwood (until January 18) then Frank Moores
Premier of Nova Scotia – Gerald Regan  
Premier of Ontario – Bill Davis 
Premier of Prince Edward Island – Alexander B. Campbell 
Premier of Quebec – Robert Bourassa 
Premier of Saskatchewan – Allan Blakeney

Territorial governments

Commissioners 
 Commissioner of Yukon – James Smith 
 Commissioner of Northwest Territories – Stuart Milton Hodgson

Events

January to June
January 1 - Winnipeg is merged into a megacity
January 1 - Canada's ban on cigarette advertisements on film, radio, and television goes into effect
January 1 - Canada's capital gains tax comes into effect
January 18 - Frank Moores becomes premier of Newfoundland, replacing Joey Smallwood, who had governed for 23 years
February 1 - The Atlantic Pilotage Authority is established
February 25 - The Pickering Nuclear Power Plant opens
April 15 - Canada and the United States sign the Great Lakes Water Quality Agreement
May 31 - The "member" level of the Order of Canada is created
June 16 - The Churchill Falls hydro-electric facility opens
July 14 - Donald MacDonald of the Canadian Labour Congress becomes the first non-European head of the International Confederation of Free Trade Unions

July to December
July 21 - Global Television Network network licence approved by the CRTC
August 30 - Frank Arthur Calder becomes the first Native Cabinet minister in Canadian history when he is appointed to the Cabinet of British Columbia
September 1 - An arson attack on the Blue Bird Café in Montreal kills 37 and leads to nationwide changes to fire codes.
September 4 – Armed robbers steal 18 paintings, including a Rembrandt, along with 38 pieces of jewellery, from the Montreal Museum of Fine Arts, valued at $2 million at the time in what is not only Canada's largest art theft but its largest theft of private property ever. Except for one returned in an attempt to negotiate a ransom, none of the paintings have been recovered nor have the thieves ever been identified publicly.
September 12 - Heritage Canada is established
September 15 - David Barrett becomes premier of British Columbia, replacing W.A.C. Bennett, who had governed for 20 years
September 27 - The sale of fire crackers is banned in Canada
September 28 - CITY-TV begins broadcasting in Toronto
October 30 - Federal election: Pierre Trudeau's Liberals win a minority
November 9 - Anik I, the world's first non-military communications satellite is launched.
December - The government's Parliamentary Flag Program begins
December 14 - Muriel McQueen Fergusson becomes the first female Speaker of the Senate of Canada.

Full date unknown
Government pensions are indexed to cost of living
The Art Bank is established
The Government of Ontario renames all departments to ministries.

Arts and literature

New works
Robertson Davies: The Manticore
Margaret Atwood: Survival: A Thematic Guide to Canadian Literature
Mordecai Richler: Shovelling Trouble
John Newlove: Lies
Milton Acorn: More Poems for People
Donald Jack: Exit Muttering
Leona Gom: Kindling
Joy Fielding: The Best of Friends
Farley Mowat: A Whale for the Killing
Marshall McLuhan: Culture Is Our Business

Awards
See 1972 Governor General's Awards for a complete list of winners and finalists for those awards.
Stephen Leacock Award: Max Braithwaite, The Night They Stole the Mounties' Car
Vicky Metcalf Award: William Toye

Sport
March 18 – Toronto Varsity Blues win their sixth (and fourth consecutive) University Cup by defeating the Saint Mary's Huskies 5 to 0. The final game was played at the Palais des Sports in   Sherbrooke, Quebec
May 11 – Parry Sound's Bobby Orr is awarded his second Conn Smythe Trophy
May 14 – Quebec Major Junior Hockey League's Cornwall Royals win the Memorial Cup by defeating the Ontario Hockey Association's Peterborough Petes 2 to 1. The final game was played at the Ottawa Civic Centre.
September 28 – Canada defeats the Soviet Union in the Summit Series 4 games to 3. The deciding Game 8 was played at Luzhniki Palace of Sports in Moscow
October 11 – The World Hockey Association is established with four Canadian teams (Ottawa Nationals, Quebec Nordiques, Winnipeg Jets and Alberta Oilers)
November 25 – Alberta Golden Bears win their second Vanier Cup by defeating the Waterloo Lutheran Golden Hawks 20–7 in the 8th Vanier Cup played at Varsity Stadium in Toronto
December 3 – Hamilton Tiger-Cats win their sixth Grey Cup by defeating the Saskatchewan Roughriders 13–10 in the 60th Grey Cup played at Ivor Wynne Stadium in Hamilton

Births

January to June
January 1 - Barron Miles, defensive back for the BC Lions in the CFL
January 3 - Drake Berehowsky, ice hockey player and coach
January 4 – Brad Zavisha, ice hockey player
January 7 - Susan Cushman, rhythmic gymnast
January 10 - Jonathan Ohayon, archer
January 16 – Dameon Clarke, actor and voice actor
January 25 - Katrina Von Sass, volleyball player
January 29 - Shaun Majumder, comedian and actor
January 30 
 Jennifer Hale, actress and singer
 Chris Simon, ice hockey player
February 2 - Naheed Nenshi, politician, Mayor of Calgary
February 7 - Jamie Shannon, actor and director
February 12 - Owen Nolan, ice hockey player
March 13 - Sherri Field, field hockey player
March 17 - Melissa Auf der Maur, bassist and photographer
March 22 - Elvis Stojko, figure skater, Olympic silver medalist and World Champion
April 1 - Rob Anders, politician
April 2 - Graham Hood, middle-distance runner
April 9 - Karen Clark, synchronized swimmer
April 17 - Terran Sandwith, ice hockey player
April 24 - Nicolas Gill, judoka and Olympic silver medalist
May 5 - Brad Bombardir, ice hockey player
May 5 - Devin Townsend, vocalist, guitarist and record producer
May 6 - Martin Brodeur, ice hockey player
May 7 - Ray Whitney, ice hockey player
June 6 - Erin Woodley, synchronised swimmer
June 15 - Krista Thompson, field hockey player
June 17 - Steven Fletcher, politician and Minister
June 26 - Garou, singer

July to December
July 4 - Mike Knuble, ice hockey player
August 1 
Marc Costanzo, musician
Tanya Reid, actress
August 2 – Kelly Richardson, Canadian contemporary artist
August 23 – Anthony Calvillo, Canadian Football League quarterback
August 27 - Mike Smith, actor
August 29 - Amanda Marshall, pop-rock singer
September 12 - Lori Strong, artistic gymnast
September 20 - Sergio Di Zio, actor
September 27 - Clara Hughes, cyclist, speed skater and Olympic medalist
October 5 - Aaron Guiel, baseball player
October 11 - Brigitte Soucy, volleyball player
October 17 - Cameron Baerg, rower and Olympic silver medalist
November 1 - Glen Murray, ice hockey player
November 11 - Adam Beach, actor
November 22 - Gabe Khouth, actor and voice actor (died 2019)
November 26 - Chris Osgood, ice hockey player
December 19 - Charles Lefrançois, high jumper
December 23 - Christian Potenza, actor and voice actor

Deaths

January 2 - James White, World War I flying ace (b.1893)
January 6 - Samuel McLaughlin, businessman and philanthropist (b.1871)
April 7 - Woodrow Stanley Lloyd, politician and 8th Premier of Saskatchewan (b.1913)

May 28 - Edward VIII, Duke of Windsor, former King of Canada (b.1894)
August 20 - A. M. Klein, poet, journalist, novelist, short story writer and lawyer (b.1909)
October 31 - Bill Durnan, ice hockey player (b.1916)
December 27 - Lester B. Pearson, politician, 14th Prime Minister of Canada, diplomat and 1957 Nobel Peace Prize recipient (b.1897)

See also
 1972 in Canadian television
 List of Canadian films of 1972

References 

 
Years of the 20th century in Canada
Canada
1972 in North America